This is the discography of the BBC Radiophonic Workshop, a British electronic music group. It consists of releases of music and sound effects.

Studio albums

Soundtrack albums

Doctor Who soundtrack albums

Sound effects albums

Compilation albums

Stock music library albums

Box sets

Singles

References

Discographies of British artists
Electronic music group discographies